Floy Joy is the twenty-fifth studio album released by The Supremes on the Motown label. This was the only Supremes album solely produced and arranged by Smokey Robinson and included the U.S. top 20 hit, "Floy Joy" and the U.S. top 40 hit, "Automatically Sunshine", both of which were top 10 hits in the U.K.

Overview 
Following the aborted album Promises Kept, Motown handed-over production duties for the Supremes to in-house songwriter, producer, artist, and company vice-president William "Smokey" Robinson.  The then-current line-up of The Supremes included original Supreme Mary Wilson, Cindy Birdsong, and Jean Terrell. Appearing on the album cover alongside Terrell and Wilson was new member Lynda Laurence, brought in to replace Cindy Birdsong, who was noticeably pregnant at the time of the photo shoot. Despite appearing on the album cover, Laurence's vocals are not on the album.

Floy Joy marks for the first time that Mary Wilson had several leads on an album.  Wilson takes solo lead on the ballad "A Heart Like Mine."  Wilson and Terrell trade-off lead vocals on "Floy Joy" and "Automatically Sunshine", whilst Terrell has sole lead on the album's third single, "Your Wonderful, Sweet Sweet Love". Cindy Birdsong provides a rare co-lead vocal on "Now the Bitter, Now the Sweet" and a spoken passage in "The Wisdom of Time".

The "Floy Joy" single was the Supremes' final Top 20 hit on the Billboard Hot 100, reaching as high as #9 in the UK. Its follow-ups, "Automatically Sunshine" and "Your Wonderful, Sweet Sweet Love" were not as successful, with "Automatically Sunshine" peaking at 37 on the Billboard Hot 100, 21 on the Top Soul Singles and being the group's final Top 10 hit in the U.K. (#10, the fifth in little over two years for the post-Ross line-up), and "Your Wonderful, Sweet Sweet Love" peaking at 59 on the Billboard Hot 100 and 21 on the Top Soul Singles, and missing the UK Charts altogether.

Track listing

Side one
Superscripts denote lead singers for each track: (a) Jean Terrell, (b) Mary Wilson, (c) Cindy Birdsong.

 "Your Wonderful, Sweet Sweet Love"  (Smokey Robinson)a
 "Floy Joy" (Robinson)a, b
 "A Heart Like Mine" (Robinson, Ronald White)b
 "Over and Over" (Robinson)a
 "Precious Little Things" (Robinson, Marvin Tarplin, Pam Moffett)a

Side two
 "Now the Bitter, Now the Sweet" (Robinson, Cecil Franklin)a,b,c
 "Automatically Sunshine" (Robinson)a, b
 "The Wisdom of Time" (Robinson, Moffett, Clifford Burston)a, c
 "Oh Be My Love" (Robinson, Warren Moore)a

Personnel 

Jean Terrell, Mary Wilson, & Cindy Birdsong - lead vocals and background vocals
The Andantes (Louvain Demps, Jackie Hicks, Marlene Barrow) - additional background vocals
William "Smokey" Robinson - producer
Instrumentation by The Funk Brothers:
Jack Ashford, Jack Brokensha, & Eddie "Bongo" Brown - percussion
Dennis Coffey, Robert White, Eddie Willis, & Marvin Tarplin - guitars
Johnny Griffith & Earl Van Dyke - piano, keyboards
James Jamerson - bass
Zachary Slater & Andrew Smith - drums
Berry Gordy - executive producer
Paul Riser - arranger
Jim Britt - photography

Charts

Weekly charts

Year-end charts

References

1972 albums
The Supremes albums
Albums arranged by Paul Riser
Albums produced by Smokey Robinson
Motown albums